Baden (German for "Baths"; Central Bavarian: Bodn), unofficially distinguished from other Badens as Baden bei Wien (Baden near Vienna), is a spa town in Austria. It serves as the capital of Baden District in the state of Lower Austria.

In 2021, the town became part of the transnational UNESCO World Heritage Site under the name "Great Spa Towns of Europe" because of its famous medicinal springs and its architectural testimony to the international spa culture on the 18th and 19th centuries.

Geography and Geology

Baden is located at the mouth of the Schwechat River's St Helena Valley in the Vienna Woods range. They lie for the most part at the foot of Mt Calvary in the north-central part of town. These springs are caused by runoff from the Northern Limestone Alps and tectonic fissures within the Vienna Basin.

The highest point in the area is the Iron Gate ( or ), whose  can be ascended in about three hours.

History
Some ruins are still visible. The settlement was mentioned as Padun in a deed from AD 869. The nearby abbey of Heiligenkreuz's Romanesque church was constructed in the 11th century; it subsequently served as the burial place for members of the Babenberg family. The castle Rauheneck was constructed on the right bank of the river at the entrance to the valley in the 12th century; the castle Rauhenstein was built on the opposite bank at the same time. The town received its legal privileges in 1480. Although repeatedly sacked by Hungarians and Turks, it soon flourished again each time. 

The town was largely destroyed by a fire in 1812 but was excellently rebuilt in a Biedermeier style according to plans by architect Joseph Kornhäusel, it is therefore sometimes referred to as the "Biedermeierstadt". Archduke Charles, the victor of Aspern, constructed the Château Weilburg at the foot of Rauheneck between 1820 and 1825. In the 19th century, it was connected to the railway running between Vienna and Graz, which led to thousands of Viennese visiting each year to take the waters, including members of the imperial family, who constructed extensive villas nearby. In 1820, the Sauerhof became the first freestanding spa hotel in Europe. The composer Ludwig van Beethoven stayed a number of times in Baden and his residences still form local tourist spots. The location at Rathausgasse 10 now forms a museum open to the public. Mayerling, a hunting lodge about  up the valley, was the site of Crown Prince Rudolf's murder-suicide in 1889. Its primary export in the 19th century were steel razors, which were reckoned of excellent quality.

The town boasted a theater, military hospital, and casino, all constructed in the late 1800s and early 1900s. The City Theater was built in 1909 by Ferdinand Fellner. By the time of the First World War, Baden was Vienna's principal resort:  came each year, double the town's local population. In addition to a modern "spa house", there were 15 separate bathing establishments and several parks. During the war, Baden served as a temporary seat of the Austro-Hungarian high command. A new casino in 1934 made the town the premier resort throughout Austria. The Château Weilburg was destroyed during World War II. After World War II, Baden served as the headquarters of Soviet forces within occupied Austria until 1955.

Transport
Baden can be reached by the Süd Autobahn (A2). It has two rail stations: the Baden railway station for S-Bahn and regional trains, and the local Badner Bahn tram-train.

Government
Kurt Staska (ÖVP) was Baden's Bürgermeister as a result of elections of 2015, but he resigned at the end of 2016 and Stefan Szirucsek became the new Bürgermeister (Mayor). His deputy is Helga Krismer from the Greens.

City council consists of 41 seats:
 ÖVP holds 15 places
 local bloc – 10 places
 SPÖ has 8 members
 the Greens hold 5 places
 FPÖ has 2 members
 NEOS has 1 place

Population

Notable people

Natives

 Louis V. Arco (born Lutz Altschul; 1899–1975), Austrian actor
 Vincent Bach (1890–1976), virtuoso trumpeter and brass instrument maker 
 (Maximilian) Hugo Bettauer (1872–1925), Austrian writer
 Caterina Canzi (1805–1890), opera singer 
 Mario Dorner (born 1970), football player
 Willi End (1921–2013), Austrian mountaineer
 Lucie Englisch (1902–1965), Austrian actress
 Bert Fortell (1924–1996), actor
 Josef Frank (1885–1967), Austrian-Swedish architect
 Mizzi Griebl (1872–1952), Austrian singer and actress 
 Marianne Hainisch (1839–1936), Austrian feminist, women's rights activist
 Erwin "Jimmy" Hoffer (born 1987), footballer
 Natalie von Hohenlohe-Waldenburg-Schillingsfürst, Ratibor und Corvey (1911 — 1989), 2nd daughter of Maria Henriette Erzherzogin von Österreich
 Karl Holdhaus (1883–1975), Austrian entomologist
 Georg Michael Höllering (1897–1980), Austrian-British author and film director
 Besian Idrizaj (1987–2010), Austrian professional football player
 Johann Baptist Klerr (1830–1875), composer and kapellmeister
 Max Kuttner (1883 (1880) – 1953), German opera- and operetta tenor, gramophone/record- and radio singer
 Karl Landsteiner (1868–1943, New York City), physician, discoverer of the blood type
 Archduke Carl Ludwig of Austria (1918–2007), 5th child of Kaiser Karl I von Österreich and Kaiserin Zita
 Heinrich von Lützow (1852–1935) Austro-Hungarian diplomat 
 Hertha Martin (born 1930), Austrian actress
 Heribert Meisel (1920–1966), a legendary Austrian sport-journalist and sport-presenter of the ORF and ZDF
 Maximilian Melcher (1922–2002), artist and lecturer 
 Eduard Melkus (born 1928), Austrian violinist and violist 
 Josef Müllner (1879–1968), Austrian sculptor 
 Amalia Schütz Oldosi (1803–1852), Austrian soprano
 Rosa Papier (1859–1932), Austrian opera singer and singing-educator

 Jakob Pazeller (1869–1957), composer
 Karl Pfeifer (born 1928), Austrian journalist
 Arnulf Rainer (born 1929), Austrian painter
 Max Reinhardt (Maximilian Goldmann; 1873–1943, New York City), theatre director and theatre manager
 Franz Josef Reinl (1903–1977), Austrian composer 
 Franz Reznicek (born 1903), Austrian architect
 Rollett family:
 Alexander Rollett (1834–1903), Austrian physiologist and histologist
 Georg Anton Rollett (1778–1842), Austrian collector, natural scientist and doctor Georg Anton Rollett
 Hermann Rollett (1819–1904), Vormärz-poet, writer on art, archivist of the city 
 Herbert Schambeck (born 1934), jurist
 Karin Scheele (born 1968), Austrian social democratic politician and previously a member of the European Parliament
 Katharina Schratt (1853–1940), actress
 Anton Maria Schwartz (1852–1929), Catholic priest
 Rudolf Steinboeck (1908–1996), actor, director
 Marlene Streeruwitz (born 1950), writer
 Theodor Tomandl (born 1933), Austrian jurisprudent 
 Carl Ignaz Umlauf (1824–1902), composer, teacher
 Thomas Vanek (born 1984), retired professional ice hockey player who mostly played in the NHL
 Ignaz Vitzthumb (Witzthumb) (1724–1816, Brussels), Austrian composer; acted in the Austrian Netherlands
 Erik Werba (1918–1992), Austrian pianist, composer and academic teacher
 Ralph Wiener (born 1924), Kabarettist, author
 Elisabeth Woska (born 1938), actress

Residents
 Karel Komzák II (1850–1905), Czech-Austrian composer
 Michael Korobkov (born 1957), nobleman, philanthropist and businessman; CEO of IMM Birest International
 Sigi Maron (1944–2016), singer-songwriter
 Mirabehn (1892–1982), Indian freedom fighter
 Hans-Joachim Roedelius (born 1934), German experimental, ambient and electronic musician

Notes

References

Bibliography
 
 
Harald Salfellner, Julius Silver: The Imperial City of Baden bei Wien. Vitalis, Prague 2017, .

External links

 Official homepage
 Synagogue 
 Casino
 Römertherme
 Kurhaus
 Stadttheater 
 Hauervinothek
 

 
Cities and towns in Baden District, Austria
Baden District, Austria
Jewish communities in Austria
Spa towns in Austria